Matvey Gerasimov (born 4 February 2001) is a Kazakhstani professional footballer.

References

External links 
 
 

2001 births
Living people
Kazakhstani footballers
Association football forwards
Kazakhstani expatriate footballers
Expatriate footballers in Ukraine
Kazakhstani expatriate sportspeople in Ukraine
Expatriate footballers in Belarus
FC Shakhter Karagandy players
FC Bolat players
FC Metalist Kharkiv players
FC Isloch Minsk Raion players
Kazakhstan youth international footballers